In algebraic geometry, a Segre surface, studied by  and  , is an intersection of two quadrics in 4-dimensional projective space.
They are rational surfaces isomorphic to a projective plane blown up in 5 points with no 3 on a line, and are del Pezzo surfaces of degree 4, and have 16 rational lines. The term "Segre surface" is also occasionally used for various other surfaces, such as a quadric in 3-dimensional projective space, or the hypersurface

References

Algebraic surfaces
Complex surfaces